is Anza's second solo single released on April 21, 1999 under the Victor Entertainment label. The single reached #57 on the weekly Oricon chart and only rank for a week. It was used as a second opening song for the NHK anime Cardcaptor Sakura.

Track list

References 

1999 singles
1999 songs
Anime music
Anime songs
Cardcaptor Sakura
Victor Entertainment singles
Songs written by Kohmi Hirose